Massachusetts Correctional Institution – Framingham (MCI - Framingham) is the Massachusetts Department of Correction's  institution for female offenders. It is located in Framingham, Massachusetts, a city located midway between Worcester and Boston. The prison was once known as "Framingham State Prison". However, MCI Framingham is its official name and is favored. As of May 2022 there are approximately 190 inmates in general population beds.

History

The prison opened in 1877 and was the second prison for women opened in the U.S. Several references note it as the oldest female correctional institution (of those still in operation) in the United States. Its original name was the Sherborn Reformatory for Women, because at the time of its establishment it was located in that town. In 1924, the town of Framingham acquired 565 acres in Sherborn, including the prison and its grounds.

The reformatory aimed not only to incarcerate but to change the lives of inmates through work and other productive activities. The women worked a large farm and in later years other trades and manufacturing enterprises were tried. Visitors came to learn from the practices of the reformatory and its leaders. Several of its superintendents were well-known prison reformers including Ellen Cheney Johnson (1884–1899), Jessie Donaldson Hodder (1911–1932), and Miriam Van Waters (1932–1957). The prison's best-known superintendent, however, was Clara Barton, who served for eight months during a leave from her work with the Red Cross. The prison also employed female guards and physicians, and included both men and women among its board of visitors.

Among the inmates who served time at Framingham were the 19th century bandits from the Oklahoma Territory known as Little Britches and Cattle Annie, depicted in the 1981 film, Cattle Annie and Little Britches.

Covid cases 

Pursuant to the Supreme Judicial Court’s April 3, 2020 Opinion and Order in the Committee for Public Counsel Services v. Chief Justice of the Trial Court, SJC-12926 matter, as amended on April 10, April 28 and June 23, 2020 (the “Order”), the Special Master posts weekly reports which are located on the SJC website here for COVID testing and cases for each of the correctional facilities administered by the Department of Correction and each of the county Sheriffs’ offices. The SJC Special master link above has the most up to date information reported by the correctional agencies and is posted for the public to view.

MCI-Framingham today 

MCI-Framingham is currently a medium-security correctional facility for female offenders. The prison houses both state and county offenders, as well as those awaiting sentencing. There are prisoners of a variety of classification levels. Sixty-three percent of the inmates are there for non-violent offenses, most often involving drugs.

Some female inmates arrested in the Boston area are incarcerated at Boston's South Bay House of Correction under the Suffolk County Sheriff's Department.

See also

References

External links 
 MCI - Framingham - Commonwealth of Massachusetts prison information, Official Website of the Executive Office of Public Safety and Security (EOPSS)
 "More Women Prisoners", WBUR, 2000, Trustees of Boston University. Radio Interview with MCI – Framingham Prison Superintendent.

Buildings and structures in Framingham, Massachusetts
Prisons in Massachusetts
Women's prisons in the United States
1877 establishments in Massachusetts